National Ethiopian Art Theatre, Inc., was an American thespian company devoted to training, showcasing, and employing black American actors during the Harlem Renaissance.  The company was founded by Mrs. Anne Wolter on March 17, 1924, in New York City.  The Ethiopian Art Theatre School was its educational arm.

Initial personnel 
Corps of instructors
 Philip Loeb, director of the dramatic art department
 Albert W. Noll, director of music
 Henry Creamer, director of dancing
 George Bamman, science & technical director

References 

1924 establishments in New York City
Harlem Renaissance
African-American theatre
Arts organizations established in 1924

Defunct Theatre companies in New York City